The Apennine culture is a technology complex in central and southern Italy from the Italian Middle Bronze Age (15th–14th centuries BC). In the mid-20th century the Apennine was divided into Proto-, Early, Middle and Late , but now archaeologists prefer to consider as "Apennine" only the ornamental pottery style of the later phase of Middle Bronze Age (BM3). This phase is preceded by the Grotta Nuova facies (central Italy) and by the Protoapennine B facies (southern Italy) and succeeded by the Subapennine facies of 13th-century ("Bronzo Recente"). Apennine pottery is a burnished ware incised with spirals, meanders and geometrical zones, filled with dots or transverse dashes. It has been found on Ischia island in association with LHII and LHIII pottery and on Lipari in association with LHIIIA pottery, which associations date it to the Late Bronze Age as it is defined in Greece and the Aegean.

Society

The people of the Apennine culture were alpine cattle herdsmen grazing their animals over the meadows and groves of mountainous central Italy. They lived in small hamlets located in defensible places. On the move between summer pastures they built temporary camps or lived in caves and rock shelters. Their range was not necessarily confined to the hills; their pottery has been found on the Capitoline hill at Rome as well as on the islands mentioned above.

Imputations of ethnicity

In the 19th and early 20th centuries various theorists made various imputations of ethnicity concerning the Apennine culture. In the 20th century, the Italian scholar, Massimo Pallottino, who specialized in Etruscan civilization, rejected them as oversimple. At least with reference to Italy, he discarded Kossinna's Law, which states languages and ethnic groups are to be identified with archaeological groups. Therefore, Pallottino argued that terms such as "the Terramare culture" or "the Apennine culture" have no ethnic or linguistic significance.

The Apennine drew to an end with the spread of the Proto-Villanovan culture from the north. It pervaded all of Italy and introduced cremation; however, in Italy cremation existed side-by-side with continued inhumation. By the start of the Villanovan regional cultures had evolved along two main lines: those that practiced both cremation and inhumation and those that practiced inhumation only. The Tiber river was the dividing line. It also divided the two main language groups: Etruscan and Italic. Whatever the Proto-Villanovan represents culturally it cannot have been a uniform language or ethnic group; hence, an "Italic" invasion at that time is to be excluded.

Pallottino's presentation of the contemporaneous view of how the Indo-European languages on the left bank of the Tiber and southward and eastward arrived is as follows. Three waves of Indo-European language speakers, speaking closely related languages, arrived in small groups over time across the Adriatic sea and moved inland. The first occurred in the Middle Neolithic starting with the Square Mouthed Vases culture and prevailed for the remaining Neolithic and the Proto- and earlier Apennine. The Latin language evolved ultimately from their speech, in Italy. The second wave is associated with Mycenaean civilization of the Late Bronze Age and brought the ancestors of the Italic language speakers into central and south Italy. They prevailed during the remainder of the Apennine. The third wave came with the Proto-Villanovan Culture and is ultimately responsible for the Venetic language speakers. Pallottino admits that this is a tentative and unproven interpretation of the linguistic and archaeological evidence, but he proffers it as being better than the previous view of an invasion of Italic people from the north in the Terramare culture, which was distinct from and parallel to the early Apennine.

The Apennine culture was in this theory always practiced mainly by speakers of unknown languages in the Italic branch of Indo-European, from which the historical languages later came. The term "Proto-Italic", in Pallottino's view, is less useful because there was no single proto-language in Italy. Such a language would have existed on the other side of the Adriatic (Illyria) in the Neolithic. The way of life of the population in the Apennine range also is consistent with an etymology of Italia as "land of young cattle" (see under Italy).

Sites
Some of the major sites of the culture are described below.

Latium (Lazio)

Colle della Capriola ("Capriola hill")
In ancient times Bolsena was part of Etruria. In addition to remains of Etruscan structures there is a distinct site representing a hamlet of the Apennine Culture that was occupied continuously from the late Neolithic through the Eneolithic, indicating that the population existed before the Apennine and adopted it by cultural diffusion. Excavated by Bloch in 1958 the site evidences wattle-and-daub huts with thatched roofs supported by internal poles. They were surrounded with stone walls for individual defence.

Luni sul Mignone

At approximately 10 km from Blera (northern Lazio) to the west of the frazione of Civitella Cesi, on the left bank of the small Mignone river,  next to an abandoned railroad bridge is the acropolis of Luni sul Mignone. The place has been abandoned for centuries (except for archaeologists) and is inaccessible except by foot from Civitella Cesi.

On the acropolis and in a plain to the east, Tre Breci, is a site continuously occupied from the Neolithic to the Iron Age, in addition to the remains of Etruscan Luni (which was then in Etruria) on a higher plateau nearby. The Etruscan citadel is later. Part of the sequence of tre Breci belongs to the Apennine Culture.

This site was excavated 1960–1963 by the Swedish Institute at Rome and numerous C-14 dates and the association of Late Helladic pottery with Apenninic pottery, both found there, were used to date the Apenninic pottery phases. Carl Eric Östenberg summarized them as: I (1350/1300–1250), II (1250–1150), III (1150–1000), IVA (1000–850) and IVB (850–800); that is, the Apenninic there is Late Bronze Age persisting to 800 BC without the Villanovan.

The walls were stone with possibly thatched roofs. There were multiple entrances. Pottery was chiefly cooking ware. Portable hearths and hand mills were found, along with remains of wheat, barley, beans and peas. The animal bones were chiefly cattle but also pigs, sheep and goats. The population apparently farmed and raised animals. The size of the dwellings and the multiple entrances may indicate multi-family residences.

Apulia (Puglia)

Coppa Nevigata

Southwest of Manfredonia, on the coast of the Gargano in northern Apulia, are the remains of a site initially occupied during the Neolithic, and reoccupied during the Protoapennine, Apennine, and Subapennine phases of the Bronze Age. The site was fortified and has evidence of early purple dye and olive oil production, as well as contacts with the civilizations of the Aegean.

Campania

Nola
The Avellino eruption of Vesuvius in the Bronze Age preserved the pottery and remains of a village of the Apennine Culture in and under sediments from pyroclastic flow. The site is in the comune of Nola, at the locality of Croce del Papa. Unusual about the site is that the forms of perishable objects could be recovered with clarity from the cavities they left in the ash. Remains of goats were found, and also the hoof-prints of goats, sheep, pigs and cattle. Also striking are the thousands of human footprints left in the semi-indurated ash by the population fleeing into the Apennines. The remains suggest that Italics were present in Campania since at least the Middle Bronze Age.

See also

Ancient peoples of Italy
Prehistoric Italy
Vučedol culture

Sources

Bibliography
 

Archaeological cultures of Southern Europe
Archaeological cultures in Italy
Bronze Age cultures of Europe
Italic archaeological cultures
Prehistoric Italy